Madre Paula is a Portuguese drama television series adapting the novel of the same name by Patrícia Müller which stars Joana Ribeiro and Paulo Pires. It originally aired on RTP1 in 2017.

Premise 
Set in the 18th century, the fiction tracks the 13-year long passionate love story between John V, the Magnanimous and Paula de Odivelas, a nun.

Cast 
 Paulo Pires as D. João V.
 Joana Ribeiro as Madre Paula.
 Sandra Faleiro as Rainha Maria Ana.
 Miguel Nunes as Infante Francisco.

Production and release 
Produced by Vende-se Filmes, the series consists of an adaptation of the novel Madre Paula by Patrícia Müller. Aired on RTP1, the broadcasting run of the 13-episode series spanned from 5 July 2017 to 27 September 2017.

Awards and nominations 

|-
| align = "center" | 2018 || 7th Sophia Awards || colspan = "2" | Best Series ||  || 
|}

References 

2017 Portuguese television series debuts
2017 Portuguese television series endings
2010s romantic drama television series
Portuguese drama television series
Television series set in the 18th century
Television shows set in Portugal
Rádio e Televisão de Portugal original programming
Portuguese-language television shows
Television series about nuns